This is a list of public art on permanent public display in County Donegal, Ireland. The list applies only to works of public art accessible in a public space; it does not include artwork on display inside museums. Public art may include sculptures, statues, monuments, memorials, murals and mosaics.

Letterkenny

External links
Letterkenny Sculptor Centre

Culture in Letterkenny
Monuments and memorials in the Republic of Ireland
Donegal
Public art